Kvasica is a settlement on main road from Črnomelj to Dragatuš in the White Carniola area of southeastern Slovenia. The area is part of the traditional region of Lower Carniola and is now included in the Southeast Slovenia Statistical Region.

History
Two stone axes have been found near the village, testifying to ancient settlement in the area. During the Second World War, a Romani school operated at the former dairy in Kvasica, attended by children from Kanižarica. It was active for only a few months, until the population was massacred by a Partisan unit at Rožič Vrh in the summer of 1942. The Partisans attacked and destroyed an Italian military convoy south of the village on 22 September 1942. A monument to the attack was unveiled in 1959.

References

External links
Kvasica on Geopedia

Populated places in the Municipality of Črnomelj